The Fifteenth Wisconsin Legislature convened from January 8, 1862, to April 7, 1862, in regular session, and re-convened from June 3, 1862, through June 17, 1862.  The legislature further convened in a special session from September 10, 1862, through September 26, 1862.

This was the first legislative session after the expansion and redistricting of the Senate and Assembly according to an act of the previous session. The Senate grew from 30 to 33 seats; the Assembly grew from 97 to 100 seats.

Senators representing even-numbered districts were newly elected for this session and were serving the first year of a two-year term. Assembly members were elected to a one-year term. Assembly members and odd-numbered senators were elected in the general election of November 8, 1861. Senators representing odd-numbered districts were serving the second year of their two-year term, having been elected in the general election held on November 6, 1860, or were elected in the 1861 election for a newly created district and were serving a one-year term.

Major events
 January 6, 1862: Inauguration of Louis P. Harvey as the 7th Governor of Wisconsin.
 January 10, 1862: Assemblymember Alexander Campbell of Iowa County resigned his seat after it was demonstrated that he had actually lost his election to Robert Wilson.
 January 16, 1862: Joseph M. Morrow sworn in to replace the deceased Simon D. Powers as assemblymember for the Monroe County district
 April 6–7, 1862: Battle of Shiloh took place in Hardin County, Tennessee.  Three regiments of Wisconsin Volunteers participated in the battle.  Former Wisconsin state senator James S. Alban was killed, and former state senator Benjamin Allen was wounded.
 April 19, 1862: Wisconsin Governor Louis P. Harvey died in an accident near Savannah, Tennessee.  Lieutenant Governor Edward Salomon became the 8th Governor of Wisconsin.
 May 1, 1862: Union forces occupied New Orleans after Confederate forces evacuated the city.
 May 8, 1862: State senator Charles Quentin died.
 September 1, 1862: Dr. Francis Huebschmann was sworn in to replace the deceased Charles Quentin as senator for the 5th district.
 September 17, 1862: Battle of Antietam took place near Sharpsburg, Maryland.  Five regiments of Wisconsin Volunteers participated in the battle.
 September 22, 1862: U.S. President Abraham Lincoln issued the Emancipation Proclamation.
 October 8, 1862: Battle of Perryville took place near Perryville, Kentucky.

Major legislation

First session
 February 17, 1862: Joint Resolutions relative to amending the constitution in regard to the governor's salary, 1862 Joint Resolution 6.  Proposed an amendment to the Constitution of Wisconsin to increase the salary of the governor from $1,250 to $2,500 per year.  The amendment was rejected by voters in the November general election.
 March 22, 1862: Act to change the name of Bad Ax County to that of Vernon, 1862 Act 137

Special session
 September 25, 1862: Act to empower towns, cities, incorporated villages and counties to raise money for the payment of bounties to volunteers, 1862 Special Session Act 13

Party summary

Senate summary

Assembly summary

Sessions
 1st Regular session: January 8, 1862 – April 7, 1862; June 3, 1862 – June 17, 1862
 Special session: September 10, 1862 – September 26, 1862

Leaders

Senate leadership
 President of the Senate: Edward Salomon, Lieutenant Governor (until April 19, 1862)
 President pro tempore: Frederick O. Thorpe (until September 10, 1862)
 Gerry Whiting Hazelton (from September 10, 1862)

Assembly leadership
 Speaker of the Assembly: Joseph W. Beardsley

Members

Members of the Senate
Members of the Wisconsin Senate for the Fifteenth Wisconsin Legislature:

Members of the Assembly
Members of the Assembly for the Fifteenth Wisconsin Legislature:

Employees

Senate employees
 Chief Clerk: John H. Warren
 Assistant Clerk: Erasmus D. Campbell
 Engrossing Clerk: T. Wilson Caster
 Enrolling Clerk: J. M. Randall
 Transcribing Clerk: F. W. Stewart
 Sergeant-at-Arms: Bloom U. Caswell
 Assistant Sergeant-at-Arms: James L. Wilder
 Postmaster: H. W. Browne
 Assistant Postmaster: D. H. Pulcifer
 Doorkeeper: William C. Lesure
 Assistant Doorkeeper: Julius C. Chandler
 Firemen:
 C. H. Beyler
 John Crowley 
 Messengers:
 Fred Sholes
 Albert F. Dexter
 William L. Abbott

Assembly employees
 Chief Clerk: John S. Dean
 Assistant Clerk: Ephraim W. Young
 Bookkeeper: Sylvester Foord, Jr.
 Engrossing Clerk: Herbert A. Lewis
 Enrolling Clerk: Daniel Brisbois
 Transcribing Clerk: Henry F. Pelton
 Sergeant-at-Arms: A. A. Huntingdon
 Assistant Sergeant-at-Arms: Jas. G. Alden
 2nd Assistant Sergeant-at-Arms: J. W. Overbaugh
 Postmaster: A. A. Bennett
 Assistant Postmaster: N. F. Pierce
 2nd Assistant Postmaster: William P. Bowman
 Doorkeeper: J. I. Ellis
 Assistant Doorkeeper: Frederik Huchting
 Assistant Doorkeeper: E. T. Kearney
 Firemen:
 Reese Evans
 E. C. Cavenaugh
 Barnet Wilson
 Messengers:
 E. C. Mason
 Jno. N. Ford
 E. D. Strong
 Albert W. Carpenter
 Fred. VanBergen
 William Booth
 Samuel Myers
 Hugh Spencer
 Rufus H. Roys
 George D. Potter
 Linus S. Webb

Changes from the 14th Legislature
New districts for the 15th Legislature were defined in 1861 Wisconsin Act 216, passed into law in the 14th Wisconsin Legislature.

Senate redistricting

Summary of changes
 17 senate districts were left unchanged.
 The Dane County district boundaries were slightly redrawn (11, 26).
 Dodge County went from having one senator to two (18, 33).
 Jefferson County went from two senators to one (23).
 Rock County went from two senators to one (17).
 Sauk County became its own senate district (14), after previously having been in a shared district with Adams and Juneau counties.
 Iowa County became its own senate district (15), after previously having been in a shared district with Richland county.
 Waushara County was moved from the 27th district to the 9th.
 The multi-county northeastern district was divided into two (2, 22).
 The multi-county western region of the state went from two senators to four (28, 30, 31, 32).

Senate districts

Assembly redistricting

Summary of changes
 Adams and Juneau counties became separate assembly districts, after previously having been in a shared district.
 Bad Ax County became 2 assembly districts, after previously having been in a shared district with Crawford County.
 Dane County went from having 6 districts to 5.
 Dodge County went from having 6 districts to 5.
 Jefferson County went from having 5 districts to 4.
 Kenosha County went from having 2 districts to 1.
 Kewaunee County became its own assembly district, after previously having been in a shared district with Door, Oconto, and Shawano counties.
 La Crosse and Monroe counties became separate assembly districts, after previously having been in a shared district.
 Lafayette County went from having 3 districts to 2.
 Manitowoc County went from having 2 districts to 3.
 Marquette County went from having 2 districts to 1.
 Ozaukee County went from having 2 districts to 1.
 Portage County became its own assembly district, after previously having been in a shared district with Marathon and Wood counties.
 Racine County went from having 4 districts to 3.
 Rock County went from having 5 districts to 6.
 Sheboygan County went from having 3 districts to 4.

Assembly districts

Notes

References

External links

1862 in Wisconsin
Wisconsin
Wisconsin legislative sessions